Chesaning can refer to:

 Chesaning, Michigan, a village
 Chesaning Township, Michigan
 - a US Navy tugboat